Robbinsville Township is a township in Mercer County, in the U.S. state of New Jersey. The township is part of the New York Metropolitan area as defined by the United States Census Bureau, but directly borders the Philadelphia metropolitan area and is part of the Federal Communications Commission's Philadelphia Designated Market Area. As of the 2020 United States census, the township's population was 15,476, an increase of 1,834 (+13.4%) from the 2010 census count of 13,642, which in turn reflected an increase of 3,367 (+32.8%) from the 10,275 counted in the 2000 census. The township is named for George R. Robbins, who served in the United States House of Representatives from 1855 to 1859 and lived in the area.

What is now Robbinsville Township was originally incorporated as Washington Township (named for George Washington) by an act of the New Jersey Legislature on March 15, 1859, from portions of East Windsor Township. On November 6, 2007, voters approved by a vote of 1,816 to 693 a measure that changed the township's name from Washington Township (the name of five other municipalities in New Jersey) to Robbinsville, named after a settlement within the township. The official changeover took place January 1, 2008, as signs and other items with "Washington" on them began to be changed.

Robbinsville Township is known for reaching the Little League Softball World Series in four of the seven years from 2008 to 2014, the only program in the nation to do so. The team won the championship in 2014 with a 22–0 postseason record and a 4–1 win against Bossier City, Louisiana in the tournament final. the team was featured in a story by ESPNw as a perennial softball powerhouse.

Geography
According to the United States Census Bureau, the township had a total area of 20.58 square miles (53.30 km2), including 20.44 square miles (52.94 km2) of land and 0.14 square miles (0.36 km2) of water (0.68%).

The township borders East Windsor Township, Hamilton Township, and West Windsor Township in Mercer County; and Allentown, Millstone Township and Upper Freehold Township in Monmouth County.

Unincorporated communities, localities and place names located partially or completely within the township include Allens Station, Carsons Mills, Hillside Terrace, Meadows Terrace, New Canton, New Sharon, Pages Corners and Windsor.

Ecology
According to the A. W. Kuchler U.S. potential natural vegetation types, Robbinsville Township, New Jersey would have an Appalachian Oak (104) vegetation type with an Eastern Hardwood Forest (25) vegetation form.

Climate
According to the Köppen climate classification system, Robbinsville Township, New Jersey has a humid subtropical climate (Cfa). Cfa climates are characterized by all month having an average mean temperature > 32.0 °F (≤ 0.0 °C), at least four months with an average mean temperature ≥ 50.0 °F (≥ 10.0 °C), at least one month with an average mean temperature ≥ 71.6 °F (≥ 22.0 °C), and no significant precipitation difference between seasons. The township lies in the coldest end of this climate zone. During the summer months, episodes of extreme heat and humidity can occur with heat index values ≥ 100 °F (≥ 38 °C). On average, the wettest month of the year is July which corresponds with the annual peak in thunderstorm activity. During the winter months, episodes of extreme cold and wind can occur with wind chill values < 0 °F (< −18 °C). The plant hardiness zone at the Robbinsville Township Municipal Court is 7a with an average annual extreme minimum air temperature of −0.9 °F (−18.3 °C).

Demographics

2010 census

The Census Bureau's 2006–2010 American Community Survey showed that (in 2010 inflation-adjusted dollars) median household income was $92,440 (with a margin of error of +/− $11,773) and the median family income was $124,816 (+/− $10,353). Males had a median income of $96,156 (+/− $4,577) versus $65,327 (+/− $8,597) for females. The per capita income for the borough was $44,149 (+/− $2,813). About 2.7% of families and 3.1% of the population were below the poverty line, including 3.7% of those under age 18 and 4.9% of those age 65 or over.

2000 census
As of the 2000 United States census there were 10,275 people, 4,074 households, and 2,815 families residing in the township.  The population density was 501.8 people per square mile (193.7/km2).  There were 4,163 housing units at an average density of 203.3 per square mile (78.5/km2).  The racial makeup of the township was 91.00% White, 2.89% African American, 0.14% Native American, 4.31% Asian, 0.55% from other races, and 1.11% from two or more races. Hispanic or Latino of any race were 2.72% of the population.

There were 4,074 households, out of which 36.0% had children under the age of 18 living with them, 59.8% were married couples living together, 7.3% had a female householder with no husband present, and 30.9% were non-families. 26.4% of all households were made up of individuals, and 7.4% had someone living alone who was 65 years of age or older.  The average household size was 2.52 and the average family size was 3.09.

In the township the population was spread out, with 26.1% under the age of 18, 3.7% from 18 to 24, 37.9% from 25 to 44, 22.6% from 45 to 64, and 9.7% who were 65 years of age or older.  The median age was 37 years. For every 100 females, there were 91.4 males.  For every 100 females age 18 and over, there were 87.7 males.

The median income for a household in the township was $71,377, and the median income for a family was $90,878. Males had a median income of $61,589 versus $44,653 for females. The per capita income for the township was $35,529.  About 2.5% of families and 3.7% of the population were below the poverty line, including 4.1% of those under age 18 and 5.0% of those age 65 or over.

Government

Local government 
In November 2004, township residents voted to change their form of government from a Township Committee to a Mayor-Council form under the Faulkner Act. The new form of government took effect as of July 1, 2005. The Mayor-Council form of government is used by 71 of the state's 564 municipalities. In this form, the governing body is comprised of the Mayor and the Township Council, each functioning as an independent branch of government, with all members elected at-large to four-year terms of office on a non-partisan basis as part of the November general election. The Mayor is the Chief Executive of the Township and heads its Administration. The Mayor may attend Council meetings but is not obliged to do so. The Council is the legislative branch. Elections are held in odd-numbered years with three council seats up together and the two other seats (and the mayoral seat) up for election two years later. At the annual organizational meeting held during the first week of January of each year, the Council selects a President and Vice President to serve for one-year terms. The Council President chairs the meetings of the governing body. Following an ordinance passed in December 2011, municipal elections were shifted from May to November, with the terms of all township council members then serving extend by six months, to December 31.

, the Mayor of Robbinsville Township is David Fried, whose term of office ends December 31, 2025. Members of the Township Council are Council President Michael Cipriano (2025), Vice President Deborah Blakely (2025), Christine "Chris" Ciaccio (2023), Michael Todd (2023; elected to serve an unexpired term) and Ronald C. Witt Jr. (2023).

In January 2021, Deborah Blakely was appointed to fill the term expiring in December 2023 that had become vacant following the resignation of Dan Schuberth. Blakely served on an interim basis until the November 2021 election. In the November 2021 general election, Michael Todd was elected to serve the balance of Schuberth's term of office, while Deborah Blakely ran for and won a full four-year term.

Federal, state, and county representation 
Robbinsville Township is located in the 3rd Congressional District and is part of New Jersey's 14th state legislative district. 

Prior to the 2011 reapportionment following the 2010 Census, Robbinsville Township had been in the 30th state legislative district.

Politics
As of March 2011, there were a total of 8,361 registered voters in Robbinsville Township, of which 2,186 (26.1%) were registered as Democrats, 2,068 (24.7%) were registered as Republicans and 4,101 (49.0%) were registered as Unaffiliated. There were 6 voters registered as Libertarians or Greens.

In the 2020 presidential election, Joe Biden won the town 58.0% to 40.8%, a margin that was to the left of the state as a whole. In the 2016 election, Hillary won the town 51.6% to 43.9%. In the 2012 presidential election, Democrat Barack Obama received 49.6% of the vote (3,332 cast), ahead of Republican Mitt Romney with 49.1% (3,297 votes), and other candidates with 1.3% (88 votes), among the 7,310 ballots cast by the township's 9,099 registered voters (593 ballots were spoiled), for a turnout of 80.3%. In the 2008 presidential election, Democrat Barack Obama received 51.3% of the vote here (3,406 cast), ahead of Republican John McCain with 46.7% (3,099 votes) and other candidates with 1.1% (76 votes), among the 6,643 ballots cast by the township's 8,413 registered voters, for a turnout of 79.0%. In the 2004 presidential election, Republican George W. Bush received 52.9% of the vote here (3,215 ballots cast), outpolling Democrat John Kerry with 44.7% (2,718 votes) and other candidates with 0.6% (43 votes), among the 6,075 ballots cast by the township's 7,447 registered voters, for a turnout percentage of 81.6. This remains the last Republican presidential victory in the township.

In the 2013 gubernatorial election, Republican Chris Christie received 60.6% of the vote (2,102 cast), ahead of Democrat Barbara Buono with 35.4% (1,228 votes), and other candidates with 3.9% (136 votes), among the 4,433 ballots cast by the township's 9,076 registered voters (967 ballots were spoiled), for a turnout of 48.8%. In the 2009 gubernatorial election, Republican Chris Christie received 57.9% of the vote here (2,508 ballots cast), ahead of  Democrat Jon Corzine with 34.7% (1,503 votes), Independent Chris Daggett with 6.0% (262 votes) and other candidates with 0.6% (28 votes), among the 4,331 ballots cast by the township's 8,379 registered voters, yielding a 51.7% turnout.

Education
The Robbinsville Public School District serves students in kindergarten through twelfth grade. As of the 2018–19 school year, the district, comprised of three schools, had an enrollment of 3,164 students and 237.4 classroom teachers (on an FTE basis), for a student–teacher ratio of 13.3:1. Schools in the district (with 2018–19 enrollment data from the National Center for Education Statistics) are 
Sharon Elementary School with 1,058 students in grades Pre-K–4, 
Pond Road Middle School with 1,031 students in grades 5–8 and 
Robbinsville High School with 1,053 students in grades 9–12.

Prior to the 2006–07 school year, high school students from here were sent to Lawrence High School in Lawrence Township as part of a now-ended sending/receiving relationship with the Lawrence Township Public Schools. Robbinsville High School serves all of Robbinsville Township's high school students on site and graduated its first class of 150 students in June 2008.

Eighth grade students from all of Mercer County are eligible to apply to attend the high school programs offered by the Mercer County Technical Schools, a county-wide vocational school district that offers full-time career and technical education at its Health Sciences Academy, STEM Academy and Academy of Culinary Arts, with no tuition charged to students for attendance.

Development
Robbinsville Town Center, near the intersection of U.S. Route 130 and Route 33, is a mix of about 1,000 housing units, including loft-style condominiums, townhouses, duplexes, single-family homes, and real estate space.

Plans are underway to redevelop the portion of the township which lies to the south of Route 33, between the Hamilton Township border and U.S. Route 130. In December 2010, the state approved designating this property as an area in need of development, which allows the township to draft a plan and appoint a redeveloper to revive stalled construction projects there.

Robbinsville is home to a large warehouse colony, located on West Manor Way, just adjacent to the entrances and exit ramps to exits 7 and 8 off of Interstate 195. It is home to a variety of companies' distribution centers, including Scholastic Books, JDSU, Sleepy's, and Grainger Products. The Robbinsville Field House is a large membership gym located at the entrance to the warehouse colony near Route 526. An Amazon.com Fulfillment Center warehouse opened in the Matrix Business Park off of CR 539 in July 2014.

Transportation

Roads and highways

Four major U.S./State/Interstate routes pass through the township: the New Jersey Turnpike (Interstate 95), Interstate 195 (the Central Jersey Expressway), U.S. Route 130 and Route 33. County routes that pass through include County Route 526 (which passes through the center of the township) and both County Route 524 and County Route 539 (Old York Road), which travel along the southeastern border of the township.

Interstate 195 is a major artery that connects Trenton to the Jersey Shore and the New Jersey Turnpike. Interchange 7A (for the Turnpike) is located in the township, with a 13-lane toll gate. Interstate 195 also provides access to Six Flags Great Adventure in Jackson Township.

Public transportation
NJ Transit provides bus service to and from Trenton on the 606 route.

The airport averages 30,000 aircraft operations per year.

Points of interest

Wineries
 Working Dog Winery

Restaurants
 Papa's Tomato Pies
 De Lorenzo's Tomato Pies

Religious institutions

 Swaminarayanan Akshardham – the world's largest Hindu temple, inaugurated in 2014

Notable people

People who were born in, residents of, or otherwise closely associated with Robbinsville Township include:

 Shobhan Bantwal (born 1950), Indian American writer
 Ross Colton (born 1996), center for the Tampa Bay Lightning (NHL) who scored the series-clinching goal in a 1-0 victory in Game 5 of the 2021 Stanley Cup Finals
 Frank Eliason (born 1972), corporate executive and author
 John Friedberg (born 1961), fencer who competed in the team sabre event at the 1992 Summer Olympics in Barcelona
 Elijah C. Hutchinson (1855–1932), represented  from 1915–1923
 Samantha Josephson, a college student whose 2019 murder led to the passage of Sami’s Law
 Robert "Bobby" Smith (born 1951), retired U.S. soccer defender and National Soccer Hall of Fame member, owner of Bob Smith Soccer Academy in Robbinsville Township

References

External links

Robbinsville Township website

 
1859 establishments in New Jersey
Faulkner Act (mayor–council)
Populated places established in 1859
Townships in Mercer County, New Jersey